The Asahi Pro Best Ten was a Go competition.

Outline
The tournament consisted of 20 players. The format was a knockout. The 20 players were reduced to 10, with the place for number 1 coming down to a best-of-three match.

Past winners

Go competitions in Japan